Unsung Zeros was a rock band that formed in 1998 in Orlando, Florida United States.  They also stayed briefly in Eau Claire, Wisconsin where they released a single called "Louder than words".

Biography 
Formed in 1998, Unsung Zeros had a loyal following thanks to extensive touring, even attracting many fans outside their home state. Their original lineup was Josh Bonner on vocals and bass, Jerry Phillips on guitar, Zach Gehring also on guitar (who currently plays with the band Mae) and Jason Burrows on the drums.

Their first, self-titled demo was released seven months after the band formed. In 2000 they released their first album, People Mover, on Therapy Records. After months of touring, the band signed with Eulogy Recordings where they released the Fading Out EP in 2002, and later their second album, also on Eulogy, titled Moments From Mourning, in 2002. They also toured with the Warped Tour in 2002, and are featured on the compilation record.

Months after their last release, the band posted on their web site that a new EP was in the works. However, in 2004 the band announced it would be breaking up, never officially releasing the forthcoming EP. The band played one final show in their hometown to a sold-out crowd. The EP was to be titled Life On Repeat, and contained five tracks that were released to the public on their website before the band dissolved.

The band reunited on May 26, 2007, to play a show in Downtown Orlando.

The band reunited on April 15, 2018, to play a show @ Will's Pub Orlando.

Band members 
 Josh Bonner – Bass & Vocals
 Jerry Phillips – Guitar & Background Vocals
 Zach Gehring – Guitar
 Jason Burrows – Drums

Additional members 
 Omar Surillo – Guitar & Keyboards
 Nathan Chase – Drums
 Chris Martin – Guitar / Vocals
 David Kycia – Guitar / Vocals
 Andrew Kelly – Guitar / Vocals

Previous lineup:
 Zach Gehring – Guitar
 Eric Porak – Drums
 Kevin Johnson – Bass

Discography

External links 
 Official Eulogy Recordings website
 Unsung Zeros on Purevolume

Punk rock groups from Florida
Musical groups from Orlando, Florida
Eulogy Recordings artists